Point contacts may refer to:

Contact breaker, a type of electrical switch
Point contact diode, a type of semiconductor diode 
Point of contact, a person serving as the focal point of information concerning an activity
Point-contact transistor, the first type of solid-state electronic transistor ever constructed, in 1947
Quantum point contact, a narrow constriction between two wide electrically conducting regions

See also
ContactPoint, a government database that held information on all children under 18 in England
Contact Point, a small rock headland on Trinity Peninsula, Antarctica